The following ships of the Indian Navy have been named Khukri:

Subsequently became INS Khukri and on conversion into a surveying ship in 1951 renamed Investigator. She was scrapped in 1975
 was a Type 14,  commissioned in 1958, which served in the Portuguese-Indian War and the Indo-Pakistani War of 1971
 was the lead ship of her class launched in 1989, serving under both the  Eastern and  Western fleets of the Indian Navy in her 32 years of service before being decommissioned in 2021.

Indian Navy ship names